John Ewart Tucker (born 22 January 1975) is an Australian politician. He was elected to the Tasmanian House of Assembly in a countback conducted on 12 March 2019 to fill a vacancy in the electorate of Lyons caused by the resignation of Rene Hidding.

Before his election to state parliament, Tucker served as a councillor on Break O'Day Council.

References

External links

1975 births
Living people
Members of the Tasmanian House of Assembly
Liberal Party of Australia members of the Parliament of Tasmania
Tasmanian local councillors
21st-century Australian politicians